Jamie Lowell (born May 2, 2002) is an American soccer player who plays as a goalkeeper for the Seattle Sounders FC academy.

References

External links
 

Association football goalkeepers
American soccer players
Tacoma Defiance players
USL Championship players
Soccer players from New Hampshire
2002 births
Living people
People from Brentwood, New Hampshire